Karachi Cattle Market (also known as Cow Mandi or Maweshi Mandi) is a cattle market set up each year at Super Highway near Sohrab Goth, Karachi, Pakistan. The market is often regarded as Asia's largest cattle market, and thousands of animals are sold by small, independent traders. The purchasers buy the animals to sacrifice them on account of Eid al-Adha, an annual festival celebrated among the Muslims.

Location and Size
Karachi Cattle Market is located at a distance of 13 kilometers from Sohrab Goth Interchange. The size of the market is over 900 acres, where more than 700,000 livestock, including cows, goats and lambs are displayed for sale. The sellers mainly arrive from rural regions of Sindh and Punjab, where livestock farming is a common profession.

The market plays a fundamental role in catering the large demand of the citizens of Karachi. With an annual estimated trade of 150 billion Pakistani Rupees, the market plays an essential role in the economy of the country.

Traffic Disruptions
While the market offers an opportunity for the city-wide buyers to purchase livestock, it leads to widespread traffic jams in the surrounding areas. The residents of Super Highway, including Gulzar e Hijri, have frequently protested against the traffic congestions and blockage of roads.

Lumpy skin disease outbreak

References 

Market towns in Pakistan
Bazaars in Karachi